"Just the Way You Are" is the debut single of Italian house group Milky. Although it did not chart in the band's home country, it was a top-10 hit in the United Kingdom, reaching number eight on the UK Singles Chart, and charted within the top 30 in Ireland, the Netherlands, New Zealand, and Romania. In the United States, the single was the first song to make its official debut at number one on the Billboard Hot Dance Airplay chart on 17 October 2003, even though it reached number one on 28 September, when it was an unpublished chart.

Content

The track features the vocals of German singer Giuditta, whose lyrical "do-do-do's" make up the song's most chorus line, with an Ibiza-influenced guitar beat, done over a pair of sampled tracks "Streets of Your Town" by the Australian pop group the Go-Betweens, and "Listen to What the Man Said" by Paul McCartney & Wings. McCartney and his late wife Linda both receive writing and production credits on the single because of the use of the song elements from "Listen", as does McLennan–Forster because of the "Streets" sample used.

Music video
For the song's video and promotional campaign during its chart run, Egyptian-German model Sabrina Elahl is featured in the music video instead of Giuditta.

Track listings

Italian 12-inch vinyl
A1. "Just the Way You Are" (original extended mix) – 6:15
A2. "Just the Way You Are" (Liquid People Manners vocal) – 7:04
B1. "Just the Way You Are" (Full Intention club mix) – 7:31
B2. "Just the Way You Are" (Almighty mix) – 7:08

Italian maxi-single
 "Just the Way You Are" (original FM cut) – 3:28
 "Just the Way You Are" (original extended mix) – 6:15
 "Just the Way You Are" (Liquid People Manners vocal) – 7:04
 "Just the Way You Are" (Full Intention club mix) – 7:31
 "Just the Way You Are" (Full Intention radio mix) – 3:11
 "Just the Way You Are" (Almighty mix) – 7:08

European CD single
 "Just the Way You Are" (radio edit) – 3:31
 "Just the Way You Are" (Full Intention club mix) – 7:17

UK and Irish CD single
 "Just the Way You Are" (radio edit) – 3:31
 "Just the Way You Are" (Full Intention club mix) – 7:17
 "Just the Way You Are" (Almighty mix) – 7:08

Australian maxi-single
 "Just the Way You Are" (original FM cut) – 3:28
 "Just the Way You Are" (Full Intention radio mix) – 3:11
 "Just the Way You Are" (original extended mix) – 6:15
 "Just the Way You Are" (Full Intention club mix) – 7:31
 "Just the Way You Are" (Almighty mix) – 7:08

US 12-inch vinyl
A1. "Just the Way You Are" (original extended mix) – 6:15
A2. "Just the Way You Are" (Almighty mix) – 7:08
B1. "Just the Way You Are" (Gardeweg mix) – 6:00
B2. "Just the Way You Are" (Liquid People main mix) – 7:00

Charts

Weekly charts

Year-end charts

Release history

References

External links
 From Billboard.com (9 July 2003)

2002 debut singles
2002 songs
Milky songs
Multiply Records singles
Songs written by Linda McCartney
Songs written by Paul McCartney